Joseph Morris Mine is a heritage-listed former mine at Georgetown Mining District, Gilberton, Shire of Etheridge, Queensland, Australia. It was built from 1903 to 1910. It was added to the Queensland Heritage Register on 5 April 2004.

History 
The Etheridge Gold Fields were discovered in 1869, with the first findings along the Etheridge River.

The gold found around Gilberton occurred in a free state and was erratically distributed. Sometimes almost barren quartz yielded phenomenally rich patches of gold. For example,  of ore from the Joseph Morris field returned  after rich specimens had been removed.

Although the nearby Cosmopolitan line of reefs was worked from 1871, the Joseph Morris reef was not worked until 1903.

A  nugget is reported to have been found near the Joseph Morris mine. The reef was well noted for its sometimes extremely rich returns.

Local information claims that the mine was named after the son of an early owner, though this has not been able to be confirmed.

Description 
The mine workings are located immediately on top of a steep bank overlooking a creek. A mullock dump descends from the shaft to the creek bed. A portable engine and a portable boiler are aligned to the mine workings. The boiler is a wet bottom type constructed with early conical pointed rivets and possibly manufactured in the United States. Remnants of a stone mount for a Cornish boiler, located alongside the portable plant, are also aligned towards the mine. A Cornish boiler, which was still on site (though not in situ) in the mid 1970s, has since been removed. South of the machinery area is a rock scatter associated with a stone and mud mortar flue and chimney base, which may have also been foundations for a second Cornish boiler. Further south is an iron lined assay furnace of stone construction, and a small top-fed retort kiln. There is no definite evidence of a battery, such as discarded stamps, cams or tailings. However these were more likely tension bolts for an engine or winch. An extensive area on the opposite bank of the creek extending west to the main road has been subjected to recent tree clearance and surface bulldozing. If a battery was located on the west side of Sandy Creek then all evidence of foundations and dumps would have been lost.

Surviving plants include:
 one-cylinder portable steam engine - no brand (R. Hornsby or Ruston Hornsby?)
 Portable wet bottom boiler - no brand

Heritage listing 
Joseph Morris Mine was listed on the Queensland Heritage Register on 5 April 2004 having satisfied the following criteria.

The place is important in demonstrating the evolution or pattern of Queensland's history.

The Joseph Morris mine is important in demonstrating the evolution of the gold-mining industry in Queensland, particularly in the remote Gilberton field, a part of the Etheridge Gold Field.
The Joseph Morris mine is significant for demonstrating a range of gold yields in quartz ore from barren to exceedingly rich.

The place demonstrates rare, uncommon or endangered aspects of Queensland's cultural heritage.

A portable steam engine and portable boiler on site are now the only such surviving examples recorded in the Gilberton locality. The wet bottom portable boiler is possibly of United States origin and is early and rare. It is the only wet bottom boiler recorded in North Queensland, and was probably used to power winding gear.

The place is important in demonstrating the principal characteristics of a particular class of cultural places.

The Joseph Morris mine is significant as it is representative example of the human effort and those technologies employed in gold mining operations during the second period of early mining on the Gilberton field at the beginning of the 20th century.
The place contains a range of plant and structural features that were once representative of the second period of early mining on the remote Gilberton field.

References

Attribution 

Queensland Heritage Register
Gilberton, Queensland (Etheridge Shire)
Mines in Queensland
Articles incorporating text from the Queensland Heritage Register
Buildings and structures in Far North Queensland
Mining in Queensland